Events from the 1500s in England.

Incumbents
 Monarch – Henry VII (until 21 April 1509), then Henry VIII 
 Regent – Margaret Beaufort, Countess of Richmond and Derby (starting 21 April, until 28 June 1509)
 Parliament – 7th of King Henry VII (starting 25 January, until c. 1 April 1504)

Events
1500
Publication of This is the Boke of Cokery, the first known printed cookbook in English.
1501
27 January – Archbishop of Canterbury-elect Thomas Langton dies before his consecration.
March – first royal court held at the new Richmond Palace.
26 April – Henry Deane elected to the Archbishopric of Canterbury.
2 October – Catherine of Aragon first sets foot in England, at Plymouth; on 4 November she meets her intended spouse, Arthur, Prince of Wales, for the first time, at Dogmersfield in Hampshire.
14 November – Marriage of Arthur, Prince of Wales to Catherine of Aragon at St Paul's Cathedral in London by the Archbishop of Canterbury, followed by a public bedding.
1502
24 January – Treaty of Perpetual Peace between Scotland and England is signed at Richmond Palace.
2 April – death of Arthur, Prince of Wales of fever, at Ludlow Castle, aged 15. He is buried in Worcester Cathedral.
6 May – James Tyrrell executed for allegedly murdering the Princes in the Tower.
19 June – Treaty between England and the Holy Roman Empire signed at Aachen.
26 December – Edmund de la Pole, 3rd Duke of Suffolk, is proclaimed an outlaw at Ipswich on suspicion of plotting against the King.
Bristol merchants return from Newfoundland carrying three native people and cod from the Grand Banks.
Macclesfield Grammar School is founded by Sir John Percyvale.
1503
24 January – construction of Henry VII's Chapel at Westminster Abbey begins.
8 August – marriage of James IV of Scotland and Henry VII's daughter, Margaret Tudor.
19 November – William Warham enthroned as Archbishop of Canterbury.
1504
18 February – Henry Tudor created Prince of Wales.
March – private liveried retainers banned.
Silver shilling is the first English coin to be minted bearing a recognisable portrait of the King.
1505
28 June – planned marriage of Henry Tudor and Catherine of Aragon postponed when the dowry fails to arrive from Spain.
Christ's College, Cambridge is granted a royal charter at the instigation of Lady Margaret Beaufort, the King's mother, refounding it under its present name.
1506
16 January – Duke Philip IV of Burgundy lands at Melcombe Regis after the fleet carrying him to Castile (where he is to take the crown) runs into a violent storm.
9 February and 20 March – Treaties of Windsor ally England, Burgundy, and the Habsburgs against France.
24 April – Edmund de la Pole, 3rd Duke of Suffolk, imprisoned as a rival claimant to the throne.
30 April – Malus Intercursus, a treaty between Henry VII and Philip of Burgundy, is signed at Melcombe Regis.
1507
21 December – Henry VII arranges a marriage between his younger daughter, Mary Tudor and Habsburg Archduke Charles.
1508
December – formation of the League of Cambrai between France and the Habsburgs results in the wedding between Mary Tudor and Archduke Charles being called off.
1509
22 April – the 17-year-old Henry VIII becomes King of England on the death of his father, Henry VII; he will reign for 38 years. His grandmother Lady Margaret Beaufort serves as regent until her death on 29 June.
11 June – Henry VIII marries Catherine of Aragon, his brother's widow.
19 June – Brasenose College, University of Oxford, is founded by Sir Richard Sutton (lawyer), of Prestbury, Cheshire, and the Bishop of Lincoln, William Smyth.
24 June – coronation of Henry VIII.
29 June – death of Lady Margaret Beaufort initiates foundation of St John's College, Cambridge (charter 1511).
November – Court chaplain Thomas Wolsey becomes royal almoner.
Formation of the Troop of Gentlemen as a royal escort, origin of the Honourable Corps of Gentlemen at Arms.
Desiderius Erasmus writes The Praise of Folly while staying with Thomas More.
St Paul's School, London, is founded by John Colet, Dean of St. Paul's Cathedral.
Royal Grammar School, Guildford, is founded under the will of Robert Beckingham.
Queen Elizabeth's Grammar School, Blackburn, is founded.

Births
1500
12 March – Reginald Pole, Cardinal Archbishop of Canterbury (died 1558)
1501
16 January – Anthony Denny, confidant of Henry VIII of England (died 1559)
21 March – Anne Brooke, Baroness Cobham, born Anne Braye (died 1558)
18 September – Henry Stafford, nobleman (died 1563)
approximate date
Anne Boleyn, second queen consort of Henry VIII of England (executed 1536)
Nicholas Heath, archbishop of York and Lord Chancellor (died 1578)
1502 – approximate date
Elizabeth Blount, mistress of King Henry VIII of England (died 1540)
Henry Percy, 6th Earl of Northumberland, courtier (died 1537)
1503
13 September (?) – John Leland, antiquarian (died 1552)
John Frith, Protestant priest and martyr (died 1533)
Approximate date – Thomas Wyatt, lyrical poet and diplomat (died 1542)
1504
6 August – Matthew Parker, Archbishop of Canterbury (died 1574)
c. December – Nicholas Udall, playwright and schoolmaster (died 1556)
John Dudley, 1st Duke of Northumberland, Tudor nobleman and politician (executed 1553)
1505
William Cavendish, courtier (died 1557)
Philip Hoby, politician (died 1558)
Thomas Wriothesley, 1st Earl of Southampton, politician (died 1550)
Thomas Tallis, composer (died 1585)
Christopher Tye, composer and organist (died 1572)
1506
Elizabeth Barton, nun (died 1534)
Margaret Lee, confidante of Queen Anne Boleyn (died 1543)
William Paget, 1st Baron Paget, statesman (died 1563)
1507
Ralph Sadler, statesman (died 1587)

Deaths
1500
29 May – Thomas Rotherham, Archbishop of York and Lord Chancellor (born 1423)
19 June – Edmund Tudor, Duke of Somerset, son of Henry VII (born 1499)
15 September – John Morton, Archbishop of Canterbury (born c. 1420)
1 October – John Alcock, Bishop of Ely (born c. 1430)
1501
April – John Doget, diplomat (year of birth unknown)
20 September – Thomas Grey, 1st Marquess of Dorset, stepson of Edward IV of England (born c. 1453)
1502
2 April – Arthur, Prince of Wales (born 1486)
6 May – James Tyrrell, knight, alleged murderer of the princes in the Tower (executed) (born c. 1450)
1503
11 February – Elizabeth of York, queen of Henry VII of England (born 1466)
15 February – Henry Deane, Archbishop of Canterbury (born c. 1440)
16 March – Edward Story, Bishop of Carlisle and Chichester (year of birth unknown)
24 June – Reginald Bray, Chancellor of the Duchy of Lancaster and architect (born 1440)
23 November – Margaret of York, wife of Charles I, Duke of Burgundy (born 1446)
Richard Amerike, merchant and patron of John Cabot (born 1445)
1504
29 July – Thomas Stanley, 1st Earl of Derby (born 1435)
1507
24 August – Cecily of York, princess (born 1469)
1508
13 October – Edmund de Ros, 10th Baron de Ros, politician (born 1446)
1509
29 April – King Henry VII of England (born 1457)
29 June – Lady Margaret Beaufort, mother of Henry VII (born 1443)

References